Pamela E. Bridgewater (born April 14, 1947) is an American career diplomat who served as the U.S. Ambassador to Jamaica.

Biography
Bridgewater was born in Fredericksburg, Virginia, the daughter of a bank teller and a jazz trumpeter, and attended Walker-Grant High School. She has two degrees in Political Science, graduating with a bachelor of arts degree from Virginia State University in 1968, and with a master of arts degree from the University of Cincinnati. 
Her career was initially in teaching, working at Maryland universities Morgan State and Bowie State, and Voorhees College in South Carolina, before entering the U.S. Foreign Service in 1980.

Between 1980 and 1990 she was posted as Vice-Consul to Brussels, and Labor Attaché/Political Officer in Kingston, Jamaica. At the Department of State, Bridgewater was the longest-serving diplomat in South Africa, posted as Political Officer at Pretoria from 1990 to 1993, and as the first African-American woman appointed Consul General at Durban, from 1993 to 1996. Here she worked with Nelson Mandela during the transition of South Africa away from apartheid.

From 1996 to 1999 she was Deputy Chief of Mission in Nassau, Bahamas. Bridgewater was a member and president of the 42nd Senior Seminar, the U.S. Department of State's most prestigious professional development program, from 1999 to 2000, before serving as United States Ambassador to Benin from November 24, 2000 to December 10, 2002. Subsequently, she was appointed U.S. deputy assistant secretary for African Affairs in December 2002, where she managed the State Department's Bureau of African Affairs' relationships with 16 countries in West Africa. She served as Diplomat-in-Residence at Howard University in Washington, D.C., from September 2004 to May 2005.

From October 11, 2005, to June 10, 2008, Bridgewater was the United States Ambassador to Ghana, and from November 3, 2010, to November 25, 2013, she served as the United States Ambassador to Jamaica.

Bridgewaster is married to the Rev Dr. A. Russell Awkard, pastor of the New Zion Baptist Church, Louisville, Kentucky.

Recognition
 Department of State Superior Honor Awards (3)
 Presidential Meritorious Service Award
 Honorary doctorate of laws from Virginia State University in 1997
 National Order of Benin in 2002
 Charles E. Cobb Jr. Award for Initiative and Success in Trade Development in 2002
 Dominion Resources Strong Leaders Award 2004
 Honorary doctorate of laws from the University of Cincinnati in 2006
 Honorary doctorate from the University of Mary Washington in 2015

References

External links

 Biography at U.S. State Department

1947 births
Living people
African-American diplomats
Ambassadors of the United States to Benin
Ambassadors of the United States to Ghana
Ambassadors of the United States to Jamaica
People from Fredericksburg, Virginia
University of Cincinnati alumni
Virginia State University alumni
United States Foreign Service personnel
American women ambassadors
21st-century African-American people
21st-century African-American women
20th-century African-American people
20th-century African-American women